Pertti Laanti (born 24 April 1939) is a Finnish basketball player. He competed in the men's tournament at the 1964 Summer Olympics.

References

1939 births
Living people
Finnish men's basketball players
Olympic basketball players of Finland
Basketball players at the 1964 Summer Olympics
Sportspeople from Turku